South Dock was a railway station on the Isle of Dogs in east London. It was between Millwall Junction and Millwall Docks on the Millwall Extension Railway (MER) branch of the London and Blackwall Railway (LBR) which opened to goods traffic on 18 December 1871 and to passenger services on 29 July 1872. The station was on the northern side of the South Dock of the West India Docks, near the eastern end. It had an island platform as it was the only passing loop on the branch. The station buildings were of timber with a slate roof. Platform was brick faced. Station was staffed entirely by dock employees, company issued its own tickets.

The station was renamed South West India Dock in  July 1881 but reverted to its original name of South Dock in May 1895. It stood in a relatively isolated location in the docks area, some distance from the nearest road. Passenger usage of the station was always light and services to it, and the rest of the MER extension, ceased in May 1926, though goods services continued until the demise of the docks in the 1970s. Extensive rebuilding in the 1980s Docklands redevelopment has left no trace of the station or the line (the Docklands Light Railway reuses much of the LBR's route but runs further to the west in this area to serve Canary Wharf). Until the mid-2010s, the site was occupied by a BT telecommunications building. As of 2021, it is occupied by the 20 Water Street building, part of the Wood Wharf development.

References

Disused railway stations in the London Borough of Tower Hamlets
Former London and Blackwall Railway stations
Railway stations in Great Britain opened in 1872
Railway stations in Great Britain closed in 1926